Maxime Cassara (born 21 August 1991) is a French professional footballer who plays as a goalkeeper.

Career
Cassara trained as a youth with the training centres of Lyon and Saint-Étienne, then playing a season in the French fifth tier with Vénissieux before moving to Belgium for a season with RWS Bruxelles. Returning to France without a club, he eventually signed for Lyon-Duchère. He was first choice in the team which won promotion from to the Championnat National in 2016–17, and a good season in the higher level earned him a move to Ligue 2 side Gazélec Ajaccio in the summer of 2017.

Cassara made his debut at the professional level for Gazélec Ajaccion in a Coupe de la Ligue tie against US Créteil-Lusitanos on 8 August 2017.

In May 2020, Cassara signed for Bourg-en-Bresse.

References

External links
Maxime Cassara at Anciens Verts

1991 births
Living people
Association football goalkeepers
French footballers
Olympique Lyonnais players
AS Saint-Étienne players
ASM Vénissieux players
RWS Bruxelles players
Lyon La Duchère players
Gazélec Ajaccio players
Football Bourg-en-Bresse Péronnas 01 players
Championnat National players
Championnat National 2 players
Championnat National 3 players
Challenger Pro League players
Ligue 2 players
French expatriate footballers
French expatriate sportspeople in Belgium
Expatriate footballers in Belgium
People from Bron
Sportspeople from Lyon Metropolis
Footballers from Auvergne-Rhône-Alpes